The Edmund River is a river in the Gascoyne region of Western Australia.

The headwaters of the Edmund rise north of the Barlee Range. The river flows south-west joined by the Dundagee, Edmund Claypan, Bobbamindagee, Rock Hole, Dingo and Donald Creeks until it forms its confluence with the Lyons River. The Lyons continues until it flows into the Gascoyne River. The river descends  over its  course.

The first European to discover the river was explorer Francis Gregory in 1858. The river was named by Surveyor General John Septimus Roe after the naval hero Admiral Sir Edmund Lyons.

See also

List of watercourses in Western Australia

References

Rivers of the Gascoyne region